Rudolf Schaad (14 December 1901 – 15 February 1990) was a Russian-born German film editor. He edited the 1933 film Invisible Opponent and its French-language version The Oil Sharks.

Selected filmography
 The Countess of Monte Cristo (1932)
 The Oil Sharks (1933)
 Invisible Opponent (1933)
 Heinz in the Moon (1934)
 Such a Rascal (1934)
 A Mother's Love (1939)
 Late Love (1943)
 The Time with You (1948)
 Wedding Night In Paradise (1950)
 When a Woman Loves (1950)
 Miracles Still Happen (1951)
 Diary of a Married Woman (1953)
 The Cornet (1955)

References

Bibliography
 Youngkin, Stephen. The Lost One: A Life of Peter Lorre. University Press of Kentucky, 2005.

External links
Rudolf Schaad on Film-portal

1901 births
1990 deaths
German film editors
People from Taurida Governorate